Czechoslovakia participated regularly in the Summer and Winter Universiades since their foundation until the dissolution of Czechoslovakia in 1993. The country also hosted three editions of the Winter Universiades: twice in Špindlerův Mlýn (1964 and 1978) and once in Štrbské Pleso (1987).

Medal count

Summer Universiade 
Czechoslovakia won 77 medals in 15 appearances at the Summer Universiade.

Winter Universiade 
Czechoslovakia won 121 medals in 15 appearances at the Winter Universiade.

See also 
 Czech Republic at the Universiade
 Slovakia at the Universiade
 Czechoslovakia at the Olympics
 Czechoslovakia at the Paralympics

External links 
 FISU History at the FISU

 
Nations at the Universiade
Student sport in Czechoslovakia